There are a number of Elementary schools named Kennedy Elementary School:

 Kennedy Elementary School (Santa Ana, California)
 Kennedy Elementary School (St. Joseph, Minnesota)
 Kennedy Elementary School (Fargo, North Dakota)
 John D. Kennedy Elementary School, Portland, Oregon – former school building listed on the U.S. National Register of Historic Places
 Kennedy Elementary School (Madison, Wisconsin)